is a district located in Nagano Prefecture, Japan.

As of May, 2008, the district has an estimated Population of 86,453 and a Density of 168 persons/km2. The total area is 514.55 km2.

There are 3 towns and 3 villages within the district.
Iijima
Minamiminowa
Minowa
Miyada
Nakagawa
Tatsuno

On the other hand, if the cities of Ina and Komagane were included, the area will be known as the Kamiina Region.

History
1878 - The district was founded by the division of Ina District. The seat was located at Ina.
April 1, 1954 - The towns of Ina merged with the villages of Tomigata, Midori, Shura, Higashiharuchika, and Nishiminowa to form the city of Ina.
July 1, 1954 - The towns of Akaho and Miyada merged with the villages of Ina and Nakazawa to form the city of Komagane.
January 1, 1955 - The town of Nakaminowa merged with the villages of Minowa and Higashiminowa to form the town of Minowa.
April 1, 1955-The town of Tatsuno merged with the village of Asahi to form the new town of Tatsuno.
September 30, 1956 -
The town of Tatsuno absorbed the village of Kawashima.
The town of Takatō merged with the villages of Nagafuji and Miyoshi to form the new town of Takatō.
The town of Iijima merged with the village of Nanakubo to form the new town of Iijima.
The village of Miyada broke off from the city of Komagane.
The town of Kamikatado merged with the village of Oshima from Shimoina District to form the town of Matsukawa in Shimoina District.
April 1, 1958 - The town of Takatō absorbed the village of Fujisawa.
August 1, 1958 - The villages of Nanko and Katado merged to form the village of Nakagawa.
April 1, 1959 - The villages of Inari and Miwa merged to form the town of Hase.
March 31, 1961 - The town of Tatsuno absorbed the village of Ono.
April 1, 1965 - The town of Takatō absorbed the village of Kawanan.
April 1, 1965 - The city of Ina absorbed the village of Nishiharuchika.
March 31, 2006 - The town of Takatō and the village of Hase merged with the city of Ina (1st) to form the city of Ina (2nd).

Districts in Nagano Prefecture